The seventh generation iPod Touch (marketed as the iPod touch, colloquially known as the iPod touch (2019) or iPod touch 7) is a discontinued mobile device designed and marketed by Apple Inc. with a touchscreen-based user interface. It is the successor to the iPod Touch (6th generation), the first major update to the line since 2015. It was released on May 28, 2019, and discontinued on May 10, 2022. It was the final product in Apple's iPod product line.

Features

Software 

The seventh-generation iPod touch features iOS, Apple's mobile operating system.

The seventh-generation iPod touch was introduced on May 28, 2019 running iOS 12.3. It can play music, movies, television shows, audiobooks, and podcasts and can sort its media library by songs, artists, albums, videos, playlists, genres, composers, podcasts, audiobooks, and compilations. Scrolling is achieved by swiping a finger across the screen. Alternatively, headset controls can be used to pause, play, skip, and repeat tracks. However, the EarPods that came with the seventh-generation iPod touch do not include a remote or microphone.

The seventh-generation iPod touch supports iOS 13 through iOS 15, but does not support iOS 16.

The Apple A10 system-on-chip in the seventh-generation iPod touch enabled more advanced features than its predecessors. They include ARKit applications, and the Group FaceTime functionality.

Hardware 
The seventh-generation iPod touch features the Apple A10 processor and M10 motion coprocessor, which is the same processor used in the iPhone 7 and the sixth generation iPad. However, it is underclocked to 1.64 GHz from 2.34 GHz, making the iPod Touch weaker than other devices with the same chip. The seventh-generation iPod touch features the same front and rear camera systems as the sixth-generation device. That includes an 8 MP rear-facing camera, capable of recording video in 1080p resolution at 30 fps, and slow-motion video in 720p at 120 fps. The camera also supports different photo features, such as burst photos, HDR photos, and panoramic photos. The front-facing camera is a FaceTime HD, capable of taking photos at 1.2 MP, and recording video in 720p at 30 fps. That camera also features auto HDR for video recordings, and burst photo capabilities. It is the only iPod to come in a 256 GB storage option, the highest capacity ever offered on an iPod, surpassing the 160 GB capacity of the sixth generation iPod Classic, which had been discontinued in 2014. It is also the only iPod Touch model to natively be able to view the battery percentage without jailbreaking or third-party applications.

Design 
The exterior design of the seventh-generation iPod touch is exactly the same of its predecessor. However, the typeface for the text on the back of the iPod touch was changed to San Francisco.

Accessories 
The seventh-generation iPod touch shipped with EarPods, and an Apple Lightning-to-USB charging cable. The device also supports Apple AirPods, EarPods with Lightning Connector, and all Bluetooth headsets.

See also 
List of iPod models
List of iOS devices

References

External links
  – official site

	

IOS
IPod
Computer-related introductions in 2019
Products and services discontinued  in 2022
Touchscreen portable media players
Digital audio players